Violeta Urmanavičiūtė-Urmana (born 19 August 1961) is a Lithuanian opera singer who has sung leading mezzo-soprano and soprano roles in the opera houses of Europe and North America.

Life and career 
Urmana was born in Kazlų Rūda, a small town in Lithuania's Marijampolė County. She studied piano and singing at the Lithuania Academy of Music and Theater in Vilnius and continued her vocal studies in Munich at Hochschule für Musik und Theater München with Josef Loibl. Between 1991 and 1993, she was a member the Bavarian State Opera's Opera Studio program for young singers where she studied under Astrid Varnay and would begin her stage career at the opera house.

Urmana originally sang mezzo-soprano roles but from 2001 began singing dramatic soprano roles. She sang Madeleine di Coigny in Andrea Chénier at the Vienna State Opera in 2003, Isolde in Tristan und Isolde in Rome in 2004 and Leonora in La forza del destino in London that same year.

She is married to the Italian opera singer, Alfredo Nigro. The couple met when she was singing the title role in Gluck's Iphigénie en Aulide at La Scala in 2002.

Roles 
Roles sung by Urmana in the course of her career include:
 Medea in Medea
 Waldtaube/Tove in Gurre-Lieder
 Aida/Amneris in Aida
 Azucena in Il trovatore
 Amelia in Ein Maskenball
 Ariadne in Ariadne auf Naxos
 Brünnhilde in Siegfried
 Elisabetta/Eboli in Don Carlos
 Isolde/Brangäne in Tristan und Isolde
 Judith in Herzog Blaubarts Burg
 Ortrud in Lohengrin
 Kundry in Parsifal
 Lady Macbeth in Macbeth
 Norma/Adalgisa in Norma
 Sieglinde, Fricka, Brünnhilde in Die Walküre
 Tosca in Tosca
 Wally in La Wally
 La Gioconda in La Gioconda
 Santuzza in Cavalleria rusticana
 Venus in Tannhäuser
 Waltraute, Brünnhilde in Götterdämmerung
 Soprano/mezzo-soprano in Requiem by Verdi

Awards (selection) 
 2001 Woman of the Year (Lithuania)
 2001 Female Singer of the Year (Lithuania)
 2001 National Prize of the Republic of Lithuania for the Arts (Lithuania)
 2002 Franco Abbiati Prize Premio Franco Abbiati della Critica Musicale Italiana, Italy
 2002 L'Opera Award Italy
 2002 Royal Philharmonic Society Music Award (Great Britain)
 2007 Honorary citizenship of Violeta Urmana's home town Marijampole (Lithuania)
 2007 LT-Tapatybe Award in the arts category for the reputation of Lithuania abroad (Lithuania)
 2007 World Intellectual Property Organization Creativity Award
 2009 Austrian title of Kammersängerin
 2011 Highest Honour bestowed by the Lithuanian Ministry of Culture
 2011 "Shine Your Light and Hope Award" by Carson J. Spencer Foundation (Denver, USA)
 2012 Granting of the title of honorary doctor at the Lithuanian Academy of Music and Theatre
 2014 Commendatore dell'Ordine della Stella d'Italia
 2016 Designated as a UNESCO Artist for Peace

Discography (selection) 
 Das Lied von der Erde, Rückert-Lieder (Gustav Mahler): Deutsche Grammophon
 Best of Wiener Philharmoniker Vol. VII: Deutsche Grammophon
 Andrea Chénier: Decca
 Messa da Requiem Soprano: Naxos
 Messa da Requiem Mezzosoprano : EMI
 Violeta Urmana singt Lieder von List, Strauss, Berg: FARAO
 La Gioconda: EMI
 Oberto: Philips
 Tristan und Isolde: EMI
 Puccini ritrovato (famous arias und ensembles by Puccini): Deutsche Grammophon

DVDs (selection) 
 Aida – Metropolitan Opera, New York: Decca
 Macbeth: Bel Air Classiques
 La canzone dei ricordi (Giuseppe Martucci) medici arts
 Aida – Teatro alla Scala, Milan (Italy) Decca
 La forza del destino – Maggio Musicale Fiorentino Arthaus – Rai Trade
 Cavalleria rusticana Opus Arte
 Un ballo in maschera – Teatro Real Opus Arte
 Don Carlos Opus Arte
 Le rossignol EMI
 Parsifal'' Arthaus

References

External links 
 

1961 births
Living people
People from Marijampolė County
Lithuanian operatic sopranos
Recipients of the Lithuanian National Prize
Österreichischer Kammersänger
20th-century women opera singers
21st-century women opera singers
20th-century Lithuanian women singers
21st-century Lithuanian women singers
Lithuanian Academy of Music and Theatre alumni 
University of Music and Performing Arts Munich alumni